The Royal Academy of Fine Arts Antwerp is an art academy located in Antwerp, Belgium. It is one of the oldest of its kind in Europe. It was founded in 1663 by David Teniers the Younger, painter to the Archduke Leopold Wilhelm and Don Juan of Austria. Teniers was master of the Guild of St Luke—which embraced arts and some handicrafts—and petitioned Philip IV of Spain, then master of the Spanish Netherlands, to grant a royal charter to establish a Fine Arts Academy in Antwerp. It houses the Antwerp Fashion Academy.

19th century
The Royal Academy developed into an internationally acclaimed institute for Fine Arts, Architecture and Design. From the nineteenth century on, the academy attracted young artists from abroad. Irish, German, Dutch, Polish artists looking for a solid classical training found their way to Antwerp.
Under the direction of Gustave Wappers (1803-1874) and his registrar Hendrik Conscience, the academy faced significant restructuring. The academy's significant art collection was exhibited in its own gallery space. By 1890, this gallery would develop into the Royal Museum of Fine Arts (Dutch; Koninklijk Museum voor Schone Kunsten) and would move to its current location in Antwerp.

In 1880, a promising young artist Henry Van de Velde enrolled at the Antwerp Academy. He would become one of the pioneering 20th century architects and designers. In 1885 and 1886, Vincent van Gogh was also to spend a short time at the Antwerp academy, prior to his departure to France.

In 1885, King Leopold II commissioned the establishment of the National Higher Institute for Fine Arts Antwerp (Nationaal Hoger Instituut voor Schone Kunsten)  as a unique post graduate program, inspired by the Ecole des Beaux-Arts in Paris.

20th and 21st centuries
In 1946, the Architecture program became an independent institute, The National Higher Institute of Architecture. 
Another key moment in the history of the academy would be 1963. A unique new course ‘Fashion Design’ started. This course was moderately successful from the beginning years, but became renowned in the fashion world during the 1980s when “the Antwerp Six” designers (Dirk Bikkembergs, Walter Van Beirendonck, Marina Yee, Dries Van Noten, Dirk Van Saene and Ann Demeulemeester) became prominent alumni. Stylistically extremely diverse, these young friends had a huge impact on the contemporary fashion scene. The fashion program attracted more and more talents from all over the globe. With over 130 students it's by far the largest program in the visual arts and design department.

In 1995, the Flemish higher educational system faced a radical metamorphosis. The Antwerp Academy and the Henry Van de Velde Institute were included as faculties in a bigger college structure, The University College of Antwerp (Dutch: Hogeschool Antwerpen). However, the Higher Institute of Fine Arts was kept independent and to develop into a separate entity.

The Academy nowadays offers three distinctive programs: Visual Arts and Design, Conservation studies and a one-year dedicated teachers training. A body of 540 students (of whom 230 are international) work in the four main buildings located in the heart of the city: Mutsaardstraat (Photography, Silversmithing/Jewelry, Theatre Costume Design and Fine Arts), Nationalestraat (fashion) and Keizerstraat (graphic design). As of September 2013, the programs are offered by the "Artesis Plantijn Hogeschool Antwerpen", a fusion between Artesis Hogeschool Antwerpen and Plantijn Hogeschool.

Nurse of Painters

Shortly after the founding of Antwerp Academy, three large paintings were executed for its meeting hall. Antwerp, Nurse of Painters, by Theodoor Boeyermans  (1665; 188 x 454 cm), promotes the city's recent artistic past. Portraits of Peter Paul Rubens and Anthony van Dyck watch over students as they practise the arts. At the centre is the allegorical Antverpia pictorum nutrix ("Antwerp, nurse of painters"). Chronos accompanies other young students who present their artwork. The river god Scaldis, a personification of Antwerp's river Scheldt, symbolises with his cornucopia the wealth and bounty of the city's artistic heritage.

Notable alumni

 Willis Seaver Adams
 Willem Albracht
 Lawrence Alma-Tadema
 Wilhelm Busch
 George Edmund Butler
 Jan Cockx
 Georges Croegaert
 Ann Demeulemeester
 Pieter Franciscus Dierckx
 Marthe Donas
 John Duncan
 Frans-Andries Durlet
 Jan Fabre
 David Foggie
 Frans Geerts
 Jan Geeraerts
 Gerard Muller
 Demna Gvasalia
 Dr. Hugo Heyrman 
 Floris Jespers
 Nicaise de Keyser
 Jef Lambeaux
 Evert Larock
 Devon Halfnight LeFlufy
 William Logsdail
 Ford Madox Brown
 Martin Margiela
 Gustav Metzger
 Nat Neujean
 Jef Nys
 Roderic O'Conor
 Walter Osborne
 Panamarenko
 Mommie Schwarz
 Hideki Seo
 Heaven Tanudiredja
 Luc Tuymans
 Kris Van Assche
 Jan van Beers
 Henry Van de Velde
 Vincent van Gogh
Haider Ackermann
 Dries Van Noten
 Piet Verhaert
 Michel Marie Charles Verlat
 Bernardus Weber
 Albert Edelfelt
 Anne-Mie Van Kerckhoven
 Minju Kim
 Barış Manço

See also
List of art colleges in Europe

Further reading
 
Contradicties koninklijke academie voor schone kunsten 1663-nu (Eric Ubben,  Johan Pas, Piet Lombaerde Et al) MER publishers. Mode Antwerpen Academie 50 ( J.P Gaultier, Kaat Debo Et al) lannoo

References

External links
 

 ap-arts.be, official website of the Royal Academy of Fine Arts
 History Royal Academy of Fine Arts Antwerp | AP School Of Arts

 
Culture in Antwerp
Educational institutions established in the 1660s
1663 establishments in the Habsburg Netherlands
Education in Antwerp